Cryptophasa chlorotis is a moth in the family Xyloryctidae. It was described by Alexey Diakonoff in 1954. It is found in New Guinea.

References

Cryptophasa
Moths described in 1954